The following is a list of ecoregions in Mozambique, as identified by the Worldwide Fund for Nature (WWF).

Terrestrial ecoregions
by major habitat type

Tropical and subtropical moist broadleaf forests

 Maputaland coastal forest mosaic
 Southern Zanzibar-Inhambane coastal forest mosaic

Tropical and subtropical grasslands, savannas, and shrublands

 Eastern miombo woodlands
 Southern miombo woodlands
 Zambezian and mopane woodlands

Flooded grasslands and savannas

 Zambezian coastal flooded savanna
 Zambezian flooded grasslands
 Zambezian halophytics

Montane grasslands and shrublands

 Eastern Zimbabwe montane forest-grassland mosaic
 Maputaland-Pondoland bushland and thickets
 Southern Rift montane forest-grassland mosaic

Mangroves

 East African mangroves
 Southern Africa mangroves

Freshwater ecoregions
by bioregion

Great Lakes

 Lake Malawi (Malawi, Mozambique, Tanzania)

Eastern and Coastal

 Eastern Coastal Basins (Mozambique, Tanzania)
 Lakes Chilwa and Chiuta (Malawi, Mozambique)

Zambezi

 Zambezian Lowveld (Mozambique, South Africa, Swaziland, Zimbabwe)
 Zambezi
 Mulanje (Malawi, Mozambique)
 Eastern Zimbabwe Highlands (Mozambique, Zimbabwe)
 Zambezian (Plateau) Highveld (Zimbabwe)
 Middle Zambezi Luangwa (Mozambique, Zambia, Zimbabwe)
 Lower Zambezi (Malawi, Mozambique)

Marine ecoregions
 Bight of Sofala/Swamp Coast
 Delagoa
 East African Coral Coast

References
 Burgess, Neil, Jennifer D’Amico Hales, Emma Underwood (2004). Terrestrial Ecoregions of Africa and Madagascar: A Conservation Assessment. Island Press, Washington DC.
 Spalding, Mark D., Helen E. Fox, Gerald R. Allen, Nick Davidson et al. "Marine Ecoregions of the World: A Bioregionalization of Coastal and Shelf Areas". Bioscience Vol. 57 No. 7, July/August 2007, pp. 573-583. 
 Thieme, Michelle L. (2005). Freshwater Ecoregions of Africa and Madagascar: A Conservation Assessment. Island Press, Washington DC.

 
Mozambique
Ecoregions